Yvette Calderon is an American physician who is Chair and Professor of Emergency Medicine in the Icahn School of Medicine at Mount Sinai. Her research has focused on health disparities in Manhattan, with a particular focus on HIV and hepatitis C. She was elected to the National Academy of Medicine in 2022.

Early life and education 
Calderon was raised in a housing project in Hell's Kitchen. Her parents both emigrated to Manhattan from Puerto Rico. Her father was a member of Borinqueneers, the 65th Infantry Regiment who served during the Korean War. She was mentored by a philanthropist who created a program to keep students off the streets, and had the opportunity to visit the Mount Sinai Health System. She eventually attended Brown University, then earned her medical degree at the Albert Einstein College of Medicine. She completed her internship in internal medicine at Englewood Hospital and Medical Center, before moving to the Jacobi Medical Center for her residency.

Research and career 
Calderon started her career at the Jacobi Medical Center. Her career has focused on elimination of HIV/AIDS amongst at-risk populations and underserved communities. In the 2010s in The Bronx, where Calderon spent part of her childhood, over 23,000 people were living with HIV/AIDS, and around one quarter were not aware they were carrying the virus. Calderon made HIV testing part of routine medical care in NYC Health + Hospitals. She developed Behavioral Intervention-Rapid HIV Testing Education & Follow-Up (BRIEF), which looked to improve awareness of HIV through rapid testing. BRIEF was the first multi-media based approach to educate about and prevent HIV. She was appointed as Assistant Dean of Diversity Enhancement at the Albert Einstein College of Medicine, where she developed mentorship programs. She was appointed Chair of the Department of Emergency medicine at the Icahn School of Medicine at Mount Sinai in 2015, and medical director of emergency services at the North Central Bronx Hospital in 2016.

During the COVID-19 pandemic, Calderon was Chair of the Department of Emergency Medicine at the Mount Sinai Beth Israel Hospital. Calderon's father died from the disease. This motivated her to ensure all hospitalized COVID-19 patients would be able to hear the voice of people they knew. She investigated health disparities during COVID-19, and tried to persuade reluctant community members to get the vaccine.

Calderon developed the first digital HIV diagnostic and counseling program, which has been deployed in various clinical settings.

Awards and honors 
 2003 Inducted into Leo M. Davidoff Society
 2013 The Linda Laubenstein Award for Excellence in HIV care
 2015 Bronx Influential Women Awards
 2015 New York City Health and Hospital Corporation: Doctor’s Day Award
 2019 Crain Communications Notable Women in Healthcare 
 2021 Crain’s New York Champion of Change Award
 2022 Elected Fellow of the National Academy of Medicine

Selected publications

References 

People from Hell's Kitchen, Manhattan
Icahn School of Medicine at Mount Sinai faculty
Brown University alumni
Albert Einstein College of Medicine alumni
American women physicians
Living people
Year of birth missing (living people)
Members of the National Academy of Medicine
Women medical researchers
American medical researchers
Hispanic and Latino American women physicians